Major League is a 1989 American sports comedy film produced by Chris Chesser and Irby Smith, written and directed by David S. Ward, that stars Tom Berenger, Charlie Sheen, Wesley Snipes, James Gammon, Bob Uecker, Rene Russo, Margaret Whitton, Dennis Haysbert, and Corbin Bernsen.

Telling the story of a single regular season of a fictionalized version of the Cleveland Indians baseball team, Major League grossed $75 million worldwide from an $11 million budget and spawned two sequels (Major League II and Major League: Back to the Minors), neither of which repeated the success of the original film.

Plot
Former Las Vegas showgirl Rachel Phelps inherits the struggling Cleveland Indians baseball team from her deceased husband. She instructs team executives to fire the entire team and replace them with aging and rookie players, revealing to her general manager, Charlie Donovan, that she intends to move the team to Miami by exploiting an escape clause in their contract with the city of Cleveland: if their season attendance falls below a certain point, she can terminate the lease early. Therefore, she plans to make the worst team in the major leagues, starting with manager Lou Brown, formerly of the Toledo Mud Hens and presently running an auto repair shop.

Spring training begins in Tucson, Arizona with Phelps' list of players assured to fail: Jake Taylor, an aging catcher with bad knees who nevertheless takes pride in his team; third baseman Roger Dorn, a prima donna more concerned with endorsements than baseball; aging starting pitcher Eddie Harris, who has resorted to doctoring the baseball; outfielder Pedro Cerrano, a voodoo-practicing power slugger who has trouble with breaking balls; speedy outfielder Willie Mays Hayes, who can steal bases but can't hit; and rookie pitcher Rick Vaughn, who has a 100-mph fastball but no control, earning him the nickname "Wild Thing".

Early on, the team struggles with interpersonal relationships, with a feud particularly developing between Dorn and Vaughn, but manage to win a few games as Brown and Taylor's leadership helps put the players' troubles aside. They discover Vaughn has poor eyesight, and once fitted with glasses, he becomes a dominant pitcher. Team morale and performance improve, so Phelps removes several amenities such as their plane and working plumbing, but they continue to soldier on. Taylor reconnects with his old girlfriend Lynn and tries to rekindle their relationship, even though she is engaged to be married in October.

Nearly three-quarters of the way through the season, the team is 60-61, far exceeding anyone's expectations, and attendance has begun to improve. At this point, Donovan, tired of Phelps' manipulations, reveals her scheme to Brown, who informs the team that they will be fired from the team at the end of the season, whether they move to Miami or not. As morale craters, Taylor says the only thing left to do is "win the whole f*ckin' thing", to which the team enthusiastically agrees.

Armed with a newfound sense of unity, the team begins to dominate, climbing the standings until tying with the New York Yankees for first place in the American League East division on the final day of the season, leading to a one-game playoff. Watching the team's celebration on TV, Dorn's wife Suzanne sees him in an amorous embrace with another woman. In revenge, she sleeps with Vaughn (who does not know she is Dorn's wife until the following morning), and gleefully informs Dorn just before he leaves for the ballpark. 
 
The Yankees take a 2-0 lead in the top of the seventh inning, but in the bottom half, Dorn reaches safely and Cerrano finally connects on a curveball and hits a two-out, two-run homer to tie the game. Vaughn relieves Harris after the Yankees load the bases with two outs in the top of the ninth inning, and is able to strike out the Yankees' best hitter for the first time, maintaining the tie.

In the bottom of the ninth, Hayes hits a two-out single and then steals second with Taylor at bat. Taylor points to the outfield (mimicking Babe Ruth's famous called shot), luring the Yankees to play deep, then bunts; running at full speed despite his bad knees, he reaches first safely, while Hayes rounds third and avoids the tag at the plate, scoring the winning run. As the team celebrates and fans rush the field, Dorn finds Vaughn, punches him in the face, then embraces him. Taylor sees Lynn in the stands, who reveals she no longer is wearing her engagement ring; she joins him in the celebration on the field.

Alternate ending
The theatrical release shows Rachel Phelps in the owner's box in the final game showing dismay with the team's success, and this is the last time she is seen in the film. An alternate final scene included on the "Wild Thing Edition" DVD shows a very different characterization: after the game, Lou Brown confronts Phelps over her plan to sabotage the team and tenders his resignation, before Phelps reveals the move to Miami was merely a ruse to motivate the team, as the Indians were on the verge of bankruptcy when she inherited them and she could not afford to hire star players or maintain standard amenities. Brown does not resign, but Phelps reasserts her authority by saying that if he shares any part of their conversation with anyone, she will fire him.

The film's producers said that while the twist ending worked as a resolution of the plot, they scrapped it because test audiences preferred the Phelps character as a villain.

Cast

 Tom Berenger as Jake Taylor, a veteran catcher with bad knees. Taylor is playing in the Mexican League when the Indians call, and sees the season as his last chance to be successful. He takes rookies Hayes and Vaughn under his wing.
 Charlie Sheen as Rick "Wild Thing" Vaughn, a cocky young pitcher recruited out of prison. He has a powerful fastball but lacks control.  
 Corbin Bernsen as third baseman Roger Dorn. Dorn is nearing retirement and fears being injured, believing he has a future in acting, and so initially plays with little effort (despite believing himself to be a star player).
 Margaret Whitton as Rachel Phelps, a former showgirl who inherits the team from her billionaire husband just before the film begins. She hates Cleveland and schemes to move the team to Miami.  
 James Gammon as Lou Brown, Manager. Brown managed the Toledo Mud Hens for thirty years before taking over the Indians.
 Rene Russo as Lynn Weslin, Jake Taylor's ex-girlfriend. They broke up when he left to play in Mexico, but now he wants to rekindle their romance despite her engagement to someone else.  
 Bob Uecker as Harry Doyle, the sardonic radio sports commentator for the Indians.
 Wesley Snipes as center fielder Willie Mays Hayes.  He arrives at spring training uninvited, but earns his spot on the team with his impressive speed, despite being a terrible batter.
 Charles Cyphers as Charlie Donovan, the General Manager. Rachel Phelps orders him to carry out her plan of tanking the season over his objections; eventually, he reveals her scheme to the team.
 Chelcie Ross as Eddie Harris, a veteran pitcher who doctors the baseball to make up for his diminishing power.
 Dennis Haysbert as Pedro Cerrano, outfielder. He defected from Cuba seeking the freedom to practice his religion of voodoo.
 Andy Romano as first base coach Pepper Leach.
 Steve Yeager as third base coach Duke Temple.
 Pete Vuckovich as Clu Haywood, Yankees' first baseman. He has previously won the Triple Crown and has a reputation for being mean.
 Willie Mueller as Duke Simpson, the Yankees' relief pitcher, a skilled reliever with a reputation for hitting batters on purpose.
 Stacy Carroll as Suzanne Dorn, Roger Dorn's wife, who is loving and supportive until she sees her husband on TV cavorting with another woman.  
 Keith Uchima and Kurt Uchima as Groundskeepers who routinely deride the team but who eventually come around.
 Neil Flynn appears as a Longshoreman who is initially dismissive of the new team but soon realizes their potential.
 Terry Francona (uncredited) appears in archive footage.

Production

Development
The film's opening montage is a series of somber blue-collar images of the Cleveland landscape synchronized to the score of Randy Newman's "Burn On", an ode to the infamous day in Cleveland when the heavily polluted Cuyahoga River caught fire in 1969.

Much of the film's spring training scenes were shot at Hi Corbett Field in Tucson, Arizona, which was the spring training home for the Cleveland Indians from 1947 to 1992. The production used members of the University of Arizona Wildcats baseball team as extras.

Despite being set in Cleveland, the film was principally shot in Milwaukee because it was cheaper and the producers were unable to work around the schedules of the Cleveland Indians and Cleveland Browns. Milwaukee County Stadium, then the home of the Brewers (and three Green Bay Packers games per season), doubles as Cleveland Stadium for the film, although several exterior shots of Cleveland Stadium were used, including some aerial shots taken during an Indians game. In fact, the sign for the television station atop the scoreboard is for WTMJ-TV, the NBC affiliate for Milwaukee. One of the ending scenes of the movie is in West Milwaukee's legendary restaurant, 4th Base which showcases their unique horseshoe bar that is shown in the celebration scenes. Another restaurant scene, at the then Gritz's Pzazz on Milwaukee's north side, is no longer open for business. County Stadium was demolished in 2001; the stadium's former playing field is now a Little League baseball field known as Helfaer Field, while the rest of the former site is now a parking lot for the Brewers' current home, American Family Field, which opened in 2001.

Casting
The film was notable for featuring several actors who would go on to stardom: Snipes and Russo were relative unknowns before the movie was released, while Haysbert remained best known as Pedro Cerrano until he portrayed U.S. President David Palmer on the television series 24 and the spokesperson for Allstate Insurance. The longshoreman who is occasionally seen commenting and is shown in the final celebration inside a bar is Neil Flynn, who later achieved fame playing the Janitor in Scrubs and then the father Mike in The Middle. This is Flynn's first credited movie role.

The film also featured former Major League players, including 1982 American League Cy Young Award winner Pete Vuckovich as Yankees' first baseman Clu Haywood, former Milwaukee Brewers pitcher Willie Mueller as the Yankees pitcher Duke Simpson, known as "The Duke", and former Los Angeles Dodgers catcher Steve Yeager as third-base coach Duke Temple. Former catcher and longtime Brewers broadcaster Bob Uecker played the Indians' broadcaster, Harry Doyle. The names of several crewmembers were also used for peripheral players.

Sheen himself was a pitcher on his high school's baseball team. At the time of filming Major League, his own fastball topped out at 88 miles per hour. In 2011, Sheen said that he had used steroids for nearly two months to improve his athletic abilities in the film.

Reception

Box office
The film debuted at number 1 at the US box office and received generally positive reviews. It grossed almost $50 million in the United States and Canada and $25 million internationally for a worldwide total of $75 million.

Critical response
On review aggregator website Rotten Tomatoes the film holds an approval rating of 83% based on 40 reviews, with an average rating of 6.6/10. The site's critics' consensus reads, "Major League may be predictable and formulaic, but buoyed by the script's light, silly humor—not to mention the well-built sports action sequences and funny performances." On Metacritic, the film has a weighted average score of 62 out of 100 based on 15 critics, indicating "generally favorable reviews". Audiences polled by CinemaScore gave the film an average grade of "A−" on an A+ to F scale.

Year-end lists
The film is recognized by American Film Institute in these lists:
 2008: AFI's 10 Top 10:
 Nominated Sports Film

Other media

In popular culture
Rachel Phelps' character is loosely based on that of Georgia Frontiere, a past owner of the Los Angeles / St. Louis Rams, in the way she took over the franchise and how she was initially perceived. She took over ownership and control of the Rams upon the death of her husband in 1979, and eventually moved the team to her hometown of St. Louis, Missouri in 1995. The Rams (at the time owned by Stan Kroenke, who bought them from Frontiere's family after her own death) returned to Los Angeles in 2016.

The character of veteran junk ball pitcher Eddie Harris is based on that of Gaylord Perry and his affinity for throwing baseballs doctored with vaseline, spit, or any other substance known to illegally change the movement of a pitch.

When he joined the Cubs in 1989 (the same year the film was released), pitcher Mitch Williams' extravagant wind-up and release, and his frequent wild pitches, earned him the nickname "Wild Thing". As with Rick Vaughn's character, the Wrigley Field organist played "Wild Thing" as Williams came out of the bullpen; this was changed to the rock recording from the film after he was traded to the Phillies. A few years later, in 1993 with the Phillies, Williams, who had up to that point in his career, worn the number 28, started wearing the number 99 on his jersey, the same number that Vaughn wears in the film.

In the years since its release Major League has become a beloved film of many professional baseball players and announcers, and is often referenced during game broadcasts. For example, in 2014, for the film's 25th anniversary, Major League catcher David Ross filmed a one-man tribute to the film, with Ross playing the part (among others) of Lou Brown, Pedro Cerrano, Willie Mays Hayes, Rick Vaughn, and Roger Dorn. Additionally, as part of their 2014 "Archives" set, the trading card company Topps celebrated the film's 25th anniversary by creating baseball cards (using the same design as the company's 1989 base set) of Roger Dorn, Jake Taylor, Eddie Harris, Rachel Phelps, Rick Vaughn, and "Jobu". Harry Doyle's call of an wildly off-target Rick Vaughn pitch that was "JUST a bit outside" is so well-known, film critic Richard Roeper wrote in 2019 that the line was invoked by every sportscaster in the last 30 years. In 2011, Bleacher Report's Timothy Rapp named "JUST a bit outside" his fifth greatest sports-movie quote ever.

In 2017, the University of Arizona men's baseball team created a parody of Major League, which was filmed at UA's current home field, Hi Corbett Field in Tucson, Arizona. Hi Corbett was the spring training home for the Cleveland Indians from 1947 to 1992. The star of the short film is outfielder Matt "Mays" Frazier, who played the role of Snipes' Willie Mays Hayes character from the original film. Rick "Wild Thing" Vaughn and Roger Dorn are also parodied, and Arizona head coach Jay Johnson plays the role of Indians manager Lou Brown.

Major League became an inspiration for the real Cleveland Indians and the city, given the previously long-standing Cleveland sports curse that had left Cleveland without any sporting championships in between 1964 (when the NFL's Cleveland Browns won the NFL Championship) and 2016 (when the NBA's Cleveland Cavaliers won the NBA Finals and secured their first title in their 46-year history). The Indians reached the 2016 World Series, but lost to the similarly cursed Cubs. Between 1995 and 2016, the team went to the World Series three times, losing each time.

The Indians changed their name to the Guardians for the 2022 season. The opening scene of the film is an image of one of the Guardians of Traffic on the Hope Memorial Bridge.

Video game
Major League was made into and released as a sports video game, developed by Lenar and published by Irem, exclusively for the Family Computer (NES) in Japan in 1989.

Jobu
Soon after the film's 25th anniversary in 2015, a company called "The Jobu Lifestyle" began producing figurines of Jobu (Pedro Cerrano's voodoo figure). The packaging is a reference to Cerrano's locker that made up Jobu's shrine.

In news coverage of the 2017 World Baseball Classic, Team Israel's outfielder Cody Decker made a comparison between Jobu and the team's mascot, "Mensch on a Bench", a five-foot-tall stuffed toy that looks a bit like a rabbi or Hasidic Jew: "He's a mascot, he's a friend, he's a teammate, he's a borderline deity to our team.... He brings a lot to the table....  Every team needs their Jobu. He was ours. He had his own locker, and we even gave him offerings: Manischewitz, gelt, and gefilte fish... He is everywhere and nowhere all at once. His actual location is irrelevant because he exists in higher metaphysical planes. But he's always near."

Sequels

Due to the success of the film, two sequels have been produced, neither of which achieved the original's success. Major League II returned most of the original stars, with the notable exception of Wesley Snipes, and focused on the following season and the players' reaction to the previous season's success. Major League: Back to the Minors again starred Corbin Bernsen, but this time, as the owner of the Minnesota Twins, attempting to turn around the Twins' AAA team, the Buzz. A possible third sequel, Major League 3 (which was to ignore Back to the Minors), was reported in 2010 to be in development by original writer and producer David S. Ward. Charlie Sheen, Tom Berenger, and Snipes were reported to return, with the plot revolving around Ricky Vaughn coming out of retirement to work with a young player. In 2015, Morgan Creek Productions said that the sequel was still in the works.

Reboot
In 2017, Morgan Creek announced plans to reboot their classic films from the 1980s and 1990s as television series or movies following the success of The Exorcist television series. Several films in early stages of development include film series Young Guns, Major League, and Ace Ventura.

References

External links

 
 
 
 
 
 
 DVDTalk.com Review of "Major League - Wild Thing Edition"

1989 films
1980s sports comedy films
1980s English-language films
American baseball films
American sports comedy films
Cleveland Indians
Films scored by James Newton Howard
Films set in Cleveland
Films set in Ohio
Films shot in Wisconsin
Films shot in Illinois
Films shot in Tucson, Arizona
Films shot in New York (state)
Morgan Creek Productions films
Paramount Pictures films
Films directed by David S. Ward
1980s American films
Films about Major League Baseball